MRZ may refer to:

 Machine Readable Zone, at the bottom of the identity page at the beginning of a passport
 Marind language, ISO 639-3 code
 Moree Airport, IATA code
 Međuopštinske regionalne zajednice, a historical administrative division of Serbia
 Mrz, abbreviation of the month of March in Austria, Germany, and Switzerland date and time notation
 MRZ reaction, combined reaction to Measles, Rubella and Zoster viruses

See also
 
 1mrz, SCOPE and SUPERFAMILY codes for riboflavin kinase

 Merz (disambiguation)
 MRS (disambiguation)

 MR (disambiguation)
 RZ (disambiguation)